The 1987–88 UC Irvine Anteaters men's basketball team represented the University of California, Irvine during the 1987–88 NCAA Division I men's basketball season. The Anteaters were led by eighth year head coach Bill Mulligan and played at the Bren Events Center. They were members of the Pacific Coast Athletic Association. They finished the season 14–14, 9–9 in PCAA play and reached the PCAA Tournament finals for the first time.

Previous season 
The 1986–87 UC Irvine Anteaters men's basketball team finished the season with a record of 14–14 and 9–9 in PCAA play.

Roster

Schedule

|-
!colspan=9 style=|Non-Conference Season

|-
!colspan=9 style=|Conference Season

|-
!colspan=9 style=| PCAA tournament

Source

References

UC Irvine Anteaters men's basketball seasons
UC Irvine
UC Irvine Anteaters
UC Irvine Anteaters